The red-throated cliff swallow (Petrochelidon rufigula), also known as the red-throated swallow, is a species of bird in the family Hirundinidae.  It is found in Angola, Republic of the Congo, DRC, Gabon, and Zambia.

Gallery

References

red-throated cliff swallow
Birds of Central Africa
red-throated cliff swallow
Taxonomy articles created by Polbot